Events in the year 1816 in Brazil.

Incumbents
 Monarch – Queen Mary I of Portugal (until 20 March); King John VI of Portugal (starting 20 March)

Events

Births

Deaths

March
 March 20 - Queen Mary I dies at the age of 81, leaving the throne to her 48-year-old son John VI.

References

 
1810s in Brazil
Years of the 19th century in Brazil
Brazil
Brazil